Club Atlético Policial is an Argentine football club, located in San Fernando del Valle de Catamarca. The team currently plays in the Torneo Argentino B, the regionalised 4th division of Argentine football league system.

External links
Official website 

Policial Catamarca
Association football clubs established in 1945
1945 establishments in Argentina